Marcelo Pinto Carvalheira (May 1, 1928 – March 25, 2017) was a Roman Catholic archbishop.

Ordained to the priesthood in 1953, Pinto Carvalheira served as bishop of the Diocese of Guarabira, Brazil, from 1981 to 1995. He had served as auxiliary bishop of the Archdiocese of Paraiba from 1975 to 1981 and then archbishop of the Paraiba from 1995 to 2004.

See also
Catholic Church in Brazil

Notes

1928 births
2017 deaths
20th-century Roman Catholic archbishops in Brazil
21st-century Roman Catholic archbishops in Brazil
Roman Catholic archbishops of Paraíba
Roman Catholic bishops of Paraíba